opened in Kyoto, Japan, in 1982. The museum's collection of over ninety thousand items relevant to the history of Kyoto includes materials relating to the Yase Dōji that have been designated an Important Cultural Property.

See also
 Kyoto National Museum

References

External links

  Kyoto City Library of Historical Documents

Museums in Kyoto
History museums in Japan
Museums established in 1982
1982 establishments in Japan